Brington may refer to:

 Brington, Cambridgeshire, a village the Huntingdonshire district of Cambridgeshire, England
 Brington, Northamptonshire, the civil parish in the Daventry district of Northamptonshire, England
 Great Brington, a village in the civil parish of Brington, Northamptonshire
 Little Brington, a village in the civil parish of Brington, Northamptonshire